Zehr is a surname. Notable people with the surname include: 

Bridgett Zehr (born c.1985), American ballet dancer
Carl Zehr (born c. 1945), Canadian politician
Dan Zehr (1916–2001), American swimmer 
Howard Zehr (born 1944), American criminologist
Jeff Zehr (born 1978), Canadian ice hockey player
E. Paul Zehr (born 1968), Canadian professor of kinesiology and neuroscience